Harold "Happy" Hairston (May 31, 1942 – May 1, 2001) was an American professional basketball player. A 6'7" (200 cm) 225 lb (102 kg) forward, he was best remembered for playing with the Los Angeles Lakers of the National Basketball Association (NBA), and he also played for the Cincinnati Royals and the Detroit Pistons. Hairston was a member of the NBA champion 1971–72 Lakers; that team won 33 games in a row, a record not duplicated in any other American professional sport.

Early life & College career
Hairston was born in Winston-Salem, North Carolina, and attended Atkins High School in Winston-Salem. He graduated from New York University, where he played college basketball for coach Lou Rossini from 1962 to 1964. One of his teammates at NYU was Barry Kramer; the two smashed almost every record for the NYU Violets. Hairston averaged 21 points per game, set an all-time rebounding record at NYU, and scored 1,350 total points in his college career. He was inducted into the NYU Hall of Fame in 1981.

Professional career
Drafted by the Cincinnati Royals (now the Sacramento Kings), Hairston played professionally for the Cincinnati Royals and Detroit Pistons before joining the Los Angeles Lakers in 1969. In 1971–72, Hairston grabbed 1,045 rebounds; his teammate Wilt Chamberlain pulled down 1,572.  Hairston led the Lakers in both rebounds and field goal percentage during the 1973–74 and 1974–75 seasons. He set an NBA record for most defensive rebounds in a quarter with 13 against the Philadelphia 76ers on November 15, 1974. During his 11 seasons in the NBA, Hairston averaged 14.8 points and 10.3 rebounds per game.

Personal life
After retiring from the NBA in 1975, Hairston established the Happy Hairston Youth Foundation in Century City, California. With financial help from celebrities such as Kelsey Grammer, the foundation found bright children from broken homes and paid for their college educations. Hairston also hosted a celebrity golf tournament and had a small role in the 1981 Happy Days episode "Tall Story," where he played the father of an epileptic high school basketball player.

Hairston died in Los Angeles in 2001 from respiratory complications brought on by prostate cancer. He was 58 years of age and was survived by a daughter, Amber, and three sisters.

Filmography

References

External links

1942 births
2001 deaths
African-American basketball players
American men's basketball players
Basketball players from Winston-Salem, North Carolina
Deaths from cancer in California
Cincinnati Royals draft picks
Cincinnati Royals players
Deaths from prostate cancer
Detroit Pistons players
Los Angeles Lakers players
NYU Violets men's basketball players
Power forwards (basketball)
Small forwards
Steinhardt School of Culture, Education, and Human Development alumni
20th-century African-American sportspeople